The 2010 South Australian National Football League (SANFL) Grand Final saw the Central District Bulldogs defeat Norwood by 6 points to claim the club's ninth premiership victory.

The match was played on Sunday 3 October 2010 at Football Park in front of a crowd of 34,355.

References 

SANFL Grand Finals
Sanfl Grand Final, 2010